The Return to Faith Campaign (al-Hamlah al-Imaniyah), often referred to simply as the Faith Campaign, was a campaign conducted by the Iraqi Ba'ath Party, beginning in 1993, to pursue a more Islamist agenda. The campaign involved a variety of policies, including greater freedoms being granted to Islamist groups, greater resources being put into religious programmes, increased use of Islamic punishments, and a greater emphasis being put on Islam in all sectors of Iraqi life.

The campaign was conducted under the supervision of Izzat Ibrahim al-Douri, who would later become Saddam Hussein's successor as leader of the Ba'ath party. Douri used the campaign to promote his Naqshbandi Sufi order, which would later form the nucleus of the Army of the Men of the Naqshbandi Order.

Prelude and the campaign

Whilst the Ba'athist leadership traditionally viewed Islamists as backwards, treating them with suspicion, towards the end of the 1980s the Iraqi government began to make overtures towards the Muslim Brotherhood, as well as other Sunni and Shiite Islamist groups. Other initial signs of this turn to Islamism were Saddam's claim that Ba'ath party founder Michel Aflaq had converted to Islam on his deathbed, and also the adding of the takbir to the Iraqi flag in 1991. One interpretation states that such a repudiation of Ba'athism's traditionally secularist stance was driven possibly not by a genuine shift in Saddam Hussein's political convictions, but rather a politically calculated move in order to reduce the risk of an Islamist uprising against the Baathist State.

The campaign was formally announced by Saddam in mid-June 1993, with the initial stages focusing on the closing of much of Baghdad's nightlife. Saddam banned the sale of alcohol in public places, public consumption became punishable with imprisonment. Women were persecuted and executed by beheading, ostensibly in the name of combating prostitution. The study of the Qu'ran became a core subject in the national educational curriculum, and a greater emphasis was put on the more general studying of Islam, with around 30,000 Qur’an and Islam teachers recruited benefiting from a monthly allowance outside their regular salary. Behind closed doors Saddam began to advocate the creation of a pan-Islamic state, so long as such a project began with unification of the Arab world; the original position of Hassan al-Banna and the Egyptian Muslim Brotherhood.

Along with these efforts the government, already financially stretched due to sanctions, refocused resources into the construction and maintenance of mosques, for instance Baghdad's Umm al-Qura Mosque, and the expansive and unfinished Al-Rahman mosque.

The government also made use of stricter punishments for crimes, most notably in the increased usage of amputation as a punishment, which was used for crimes such as desertion and certain forms of corruption and thievery. In the last two years of Saddam's rule, a campaign of beheadings was carried out by Saddam's Presidential paramilitary force, the Fedayeen Saddam.
This campaign targeted women accused of prostitution, and according to contemporary reports by human rights groups killed more than 200 people.

Dr. Samuel Helfont, a scholar at the University of Pennsylvania, says that while "the Faith Campaign is normally portrayed in ideological terms—as the regime shifting away from secular nationalism toward a more religious outlook" in fact, "Iraq’s internal archives show that the campaign had much more to do with the regime’s institutional capacity to incorporate its views on religion into its policies without empowering hostile elements of the Iraqi religious landscape." Helfont concludes, "thus the Faith Campaign should really not be seen as an ideological shift toward Islamism, as many have seen it. It was, in fact, an attempt by the regime to fight the rising tide of Islamism in the region", though he noted that Iraqi society over the course of the 1990s became more religiously radicalized regardless of the regime's actions.

Internal dissent
The campaign did not have complete support from the Ba'athist leadership, and Saddam Hussein is sometimes cited as the only major Ba'athist leader to have supported it. In contrast the former Prime Minister Sa'dun Hammadi, and former Intelligence Director Barzan Ibrahim al-Tikriti, were noted opponents of the campaign. Barzan in particular was fearful that the Islamist groups Saddam wished to placate would eventually seek to replace him and establish themselves in his place, and argued that in the meantime any alliance with Salafists would alienate both Iraqi Shiites and also other Arab states in the region.

One of the few noted public opponents of the plan was Saddam's son Uday Hussein. His Babil newspaper criticized the program, arguing that the campaign would undermine Iraq's religiously pluralistic society, and encourage sectarian division, thereby undermining Iraq. The paper argued that Saddam's attempt to gain the support of Islamic fundamentalists was ultimately doomed to fail, as such groups would accept nothing less than strict Islamic law. The paper also published letters critical of the government and security services' tolerance for Iraq's growing Salafist movements. At another point, Babil however joined in railing against the Shi'ites, even referring to them as rafidah, a hateful epithet normally used by ultraconservative Salafis only.

Consequences
By the late 1990s, the growth of Salafism in Iraq had seen not just regime allies benefit, but also groups opposed to the Ba'athist government. This manifested itself in the late 90s in the form of a low level terrorist campaign, including the kind of car bombings and assassinations that would later characterize the Iraqi insurgency.

Part of the campaign had included attempting to infiltrate many mosques and Islamic organisations with security officials, however, many of these individuals themselves became persuaded by Salafist teachings of the groups they had initially been sent to infiltrate.

Following the fall of the Ba'athist government as a result of the Invasion of Iraq, many former members of the security agencies, now imbibed with a more Ba'athist-Salafist ideology, went on to form various insurgent groups which would place a key role in the post-invasion insurgency, with people like Abdullah al-Janabi being key examples of former security officials turned Salafist insurgents. Ultimately a significant number of these individuals would later go on to join the Islamic State of Iraq and the Levant.

References

Bibliography
 
 

1990s in Iraq
History of the Ba'ath Party
Islamism in Iraq
Islamization